Maria Collins Stark (née Carbonell) is a fictional character appearing in American comic books published by Marvel Comics. She is Howard Stark's wife and Tony Stark's mother.

Fictional character biography
Maria Stark was born Maria Collins Carbonell into a wealthy family in Southampton, New York. In her adulthood, she became a socialite and philanthropist. She dated Obadiah Stane. While staying in Monaco during a flight scale, Maria escaped from her bodyguards at a casino, where she deliberately lost large sums of money at baccarat and was escorted from the premises. Howard Stark (who owned the casino) noticed her being forcefully escorted by her bodyguards and followed her back to their hotel room. Maria and Howard formed an unlikely duo as they successfully took down the guards and escaped in a car. Their sudden camaraderie left Maria feeling captivated by this unforeseen adventure.

Maria married Howard sometime later, and together they adopted their son Anthony Edward "Tony" Stark. Maria was unsuccessful in preventing Tony from seeing Howard's alcoholism, something Tony would later face. Howard secretly programmed the Mistress AI that controlled the Arsenal robots with Maria's brain patterns.

On the Ides of March, Maria and Howard were killed in a car accident arranged by the Roxxon Oil Company. Afterwards, Tony ran his father's company and started a charity in his mother's name (which donated funds to finance various charities and renovation projects as well as the Avengers).

Duplicate of Maria Stark
Iron Man confronted Motherboard and Arsenal on the escape when Arno Stark (Tony's previously unknown brother) went into the escape, discovering that Tony's opponents have the digital engrams of their parents. When the escape system shut down, these digital engrams were salvaged by Arno. Arno became acquainted with the digital engrams of Howard and Maria and was able to give the two a holographic form. With Jocasta's help, the bio-restructuring pods Arno created gave physical bodies to the digital engrams.

During the "Iron Man 2020"storyline, Arno has breakfast with the duplicates of Howard and Maria following a nightmare about the Extinction Entity. After knocking out Mark One (the artificial simulation of Tony Stark) and the two are in living quarters, Tony learned what Arno had done to create duplicates of their parents. Tony mentioned how Motherboard killed F.R.I.D.A.Y. where Maria stated that she did it out of love for her son. At Port Authority, Iron Man catches up to the duplicates of Howard and Maria, who are instructed not to leave the safety of Brain Tower. Their condition gets worse because they left Brain Tower, and Arno had to use his DNA to fill out the missing pieces when creating them. They suddenly stop moving as Arno plans to fix them, and Tony. Arno works on reviving his parents by recreating the Arsenal and Mistress' bodies from the escape. Arno heads to the Stark Space Station with Arsenal and Mistress, who now possess the memories of Howard and Maria. The two tell Arno that they are proud. When Tony uses the Thirteenth Floor to reach the Stark Space Station and confront Arno, Arsenal and Motherboard fight his allies until the arrival of the Extinction Entity. As everyone engaged the Extinction Entity, Tony, Arno, Rescue, Machine Man, Jocasta, Motherboard, and Arsenal pushed the Extinction Entity close to Earth's orbit as the Avengers, Force Works, and the A.I. Army attacked its tentacles. It then turns out that the Extinction Entity was just a simulation and was the result of the disease that Arno thought he was cured of, revealing that the holographic armor made from the escape is now part of Arno's life support and allows Motherboard and Arsenal to download themselves to shape Arno's virtual world.

Other versions

Ultimate Marvel
The Ultimate Marvel version of the character is renamed Maria Cerrera, the second wife of Howard Stark. Maria was a brilliant scientist who suffered a genetic accident while she was pregnant with her and Howard's child. After Maria died during childbirth, Howard uses a newly invented biological armor to save the life of their son named after Antonio Cerrera (Maria's brother) who died at a young age. Years later, Howard's first wife Loni tells Tony twice that she wishes she could have been Tony's mother under different circumstances, but Tony still prefers his own mother. While what has been depicted is retconned as an in-universe fictional TV show about Iron Man's life, the actual Ultimate version of her character is briefly mentioned by her other son Gregory Stark when he jokingly says how he "came out of [Maria] before [Tony]".

In other media

Television
 Maria Stark appeared in the Iron Man episode "The Origin of Iron Man", voiced by Dimitra Arliss.
 Maria Stark is alluded in the Iron Man: Armored Adventures episode "Iron Monger Lives". Her image is used by Madame Masque's mask.
 Maria Stark is mentioned in the Avengers Assemble episode "New Year's Revolution".

Film
 Hope Davis portrays Maria Stark in the 2016 film Captain America: Civil War. Producer Kevin Feige revealed that another actress had been cast to appear as the character earlier in the 2013 film Iron Man 3 in a flashback sequence that did not make the final cut.

References

Iron Man characters
Characters created by Bill Mantlo
Comics characters introduced in 1977
Fictional business executives
Fictional murdered people
Characters created by George Tuska